Alipurduar railway division is one of the five railway divisions under Northeast Frontier Railway zone of Indian Railways. This railway division was formed on 15 January 1958 and its headquarter is located at Alipurduar in the state of West Bengal of India.

Katihar railway division, Lumding railway division, Tinsukia railway division and Rangiya railway division are the other four railway divisions under NFR Zone headquartered at Maligaon, Guwahati.

List of Railway Stations

A
Agomani railway station
Alipurduar railway station

B
Bagrakote Railway Station
Bamanhat railway station
Banarhat Railway Station

Binnaguri Junction
Boxirhat Railway Station
Buxa Road railway station

C
Changrabandha railway station
Chalsa Railway Station
Cooch Behar railway station

D
Dalgaon Railway Station
Damdim Railway Station
Dewanhat Railway Station
Dhubri railway station
Dinhata Railway Station
Dhupguri railway station

F
Fakiragram Junction railway station
Falakata Railway Station

G
Gauripur Railway Station
Ghoksadanga railway station
Golokganj railway station
Gossaigaon Hat Railway Station
Gulma railway station

H
Haldibari railway station
Hamiltonganj Railway Station
Hasimara railway station

J
Jorai Railway Station

K
Kalchini Railway Station
Kamakhyaguri Railway Station
Kokrajhar railway station

M
Madarihat Railway Station
Malbazar Railway Station
Mathabhanga Railway Station
Maynaguri Road Railway Station
Melli Railway Station

N
Nagrakata Railway Station
New Alipurduar railway station
New Cooch Behar railway station
New Domohani railway station
New Mal Junction railway station
New Maynaguri railway station

O
Odlabari Railway Station

R
Rajabhatkhawa Railway Station
Rangpo railway station
Riyang Railway Station

S
Salakati Railway Station
Samuktala Road Junction railway station
Sivok railway station

T
Tista Bazaar Railway Station
Tufanganj Railway Station

Sikkim connection

The railway line up to Rangpo is expected to be completed in 2021. In the second phase the line will be extended up to Gangtok, the capital of Sikkim.

State Wise Route KMs

See also
Indian Railways
Rail transport in India
Alipurduar Junction railway station
Zones and divisions of Indian Railways

References

External links
System Map Of Alipurduar Division

 
Divisions of Indian Railways
1958 establishments in West Bengal